Mohamed Amine Talal (born 5 June 1996) is a Moroccan professional footballer who plays as a defensive midfielder for Moldovan club Sheriff Tiraspol.

Career
Talal joined the Orléans academy in 2014. He signed his first professional contract with them on 28 June 2017. He made his professional debut with Orléans on 24 November 2017, in a 2–1 Ligue 2 loss to Clermont Foot.

On 7 September 2021, he signed a two-year contract with Bastia in Ligue 2.

On 16 January 2023, Moldovan Super Liga club Sheriff Tiraspol announced the signing of Talal from Bastia.

References

External links
 
 
 

1996 births
Living people
Moroccan footballers
Footballers from Casablanca
Association football midfielders
Ligue 2 players
Championnat National players
Championnat National 3 players
US Orléans players
SC Bastia players
FC Sheriff Tiraspol players
Moroccan expatriate footballers
Moroccan expatriate sportspeople in France
Expatriate footballers in France
Moroccan expatriate sportspeople in Moldova
Expatriate footballers in Moldova